Putra Samarinda Football Club was an Indonesian football club located in Samarinda, East Kalimantan. Nicknamed Pesut Mahakam, they won the Liga Indonesia Premier Division title in the 2008–09 season.

History

Early years (1989–2003) 
The club was formed in 1989 as Putra Samarinda Football Club, or often called Pusam, by a local businessman, Harbiansyah Hanafiah, to compete in semi-professional competition Galatama. But when the top two competitions in Indonesia, Perserikatan and Galatama, merged to form Liga Indonesia, Pusam suffered a financial crisis throughout the time. In 2000, they were forced to withdraw from the Premier Division and were sentenced to drop to First Division. The following season they were also absent so they were again sentenced to go down to Second Division.

Merge with Persisam (2003–2014) 
Besides Pusam, there was one more club in Samarinda which was a former Perserikatan team, Persatuan Sepakbola Indonesia Samarinda, or commonly known as Persisam. Persisam, unlike Pusam, did not experience financial problems because at that time they received financial assistance from the city government of Samarinda. Unfortunately, their achievements were not so good. Even to the point of being relegated into the second division in 2002–03 season. The two teams then decided to merge in 2003 and formed Persisam Putra Samarinda. By obtained funding sources from the Samarinda City Regional Budget (APBD Samarinda) and Pusam's license to compete in Liga Indonesia, they started from the second division.

The club's achievements after the merger was slowly skyrocketed. Entering the second round of the Second Division in the 2005 season, they were automatically promoted to First Division. Two seasons in the third-tier of Indonesian football competition, Persisam Putra rose to the Premier Division in the 2008–09 season and immediately kicked off by becoming champions. They were promoted to the Indonesia Super League.

Entering the 2014 season, Harbiansyah Hanafiah renamed the club back to Putra Samarinda which aimed to revive the glory of Putra Samarinda which was replaced by Persisam. Unfortunately, the club was like being abandoned by fans because there was an issue stating that Pusam was then used as political land. The discourse was also opposed by internal club members so that there was a split in club management. In addition, the club was shocked because of the corruption cases carried out by a number of their officials.

Relocation and renaming 

To improve their marketability and higher chance of success, Putra Samarinda was relocated from Samarinda, East Kalimantan to Gianyar, Bali. Harbiansyah Hanafiah, the main commissioner of Putra Samarinda explained that he was willing to change the name of the club and relocated to Bali because there were no representative of Bali in the highest football tier in Indonesia. Moreover, Pusam's previous financial condition was very apprehensive. So, after cooperating with one of the tire manufacturers, Corsa, he hoped that the club would not be dissolved.

The club were brought out of administration at the end of the 2014 season, and subsequently renamed "Bali United".

Colours and badge 
Putra Samarinda have played in orange shirts, even when the club was named Persisam Putra Samarinda.

Pusam's official emblem has undergone several changes, following the merger. When merging with Persisam, the emblem used has a round shape, adorned with Persisam Putra Samarinda text in two colors (red and black) and two stars that flank an eagle that flaps its wings which bring out the nickname Elang Borneo (Borneo Eagle). Then, irrawaddy dolphin logo appears for the first time when Persisam competed in the 2011–12 Indonesia Super League. Previously, the irrawaddy dolphin was more familiar as the Putra Samarinda logo when competed in Galatama. A dark-and-bright orange shield with two dolphins flanking a ball. At the bottom, there was the writing of Persisam Putra (Putra Samarinda in 2014) and Dayak typical carvings at the top of the logo, gave them the nickname Pesut Mahakam (Mahakam Dolphin).

Stadium 

From 1989 until the first half of 2014 season, Pusam contested their home matches at Segiri, although in very rare circumstances the club played some home games in Madya Sempaja. They also used Sempaja as their primary training ground.

In March 2014, Pusam officially moved to Palaran, built for the 2008 Indonesia National Games, for the rest of 2014 season in the hope of increasing revenue from ticket sales that are not in line with expectations when competed in the Segiri.

Supporters 
Pusam's supporter was called Pusamania, stands for Putra Samarinda Mania, based in Samarinda. But because politics entered the club, fans were disappointed and switched their allegiance to support Pusamania Borneo.

Kit manufacturers and sponsors

First team squad 
The squad given here was made up of the players registered to the club for 2014 Indonesia Super League. Updated January 2014.

Head coaches

Honours

Domestic 
 Liga Indonesia Premier Division
 Winners (1): 2008–09

Friendly 
 Inter Island Cup
 Runners-up (2): 2011, 2012

Season by season record 

Notes:

References

 
Football clubs in Indonesia
Defunct football clubs in Indonesia
Putra Samarinda
Putra Samarinda
Putra Samarinda
Association football clubs disestablished in 2014
2014 disestablishments in Indonesia